Potsdam is an unincorporated community in Farmington Township, Olmsted County, Minnesota, United States, near Elgin and Rochester.  The community is located along State Highway 247 (MN 247) near Olmsted County Road 11.  The boundary line between Olmsted and Wabasha counties is nearby.

History
Potsdam was laid out circa 1860, and named after Potsdam, in Germany. A post office was established at Potsdam in 1873, and remained in operation until 1905.

References

Unincorporated communities in Olmsted County, Minnesota
Unincorporated communities in Minnesota